Megachile diodontura is a species of bee in the family Megachilidae. It was described by Theodore Dru Alison Cockerell in 1922.

References

Diodontura
Insects described in 1922